Siramesine (or Lu 28-179) is a sigma receptor agonist, selective for the σ2 subtype. In animal studies, siramesine has been shown to produce anxiolytic and antidepressant effects. It was developed by the pharmaceutical company H Lundbeck for the treatment of anxiety, although development was discontinued after clinical trials showed a lack of efficacy in humans.

Siramesine has been shown to produce an enhanced antidepressant effect when co-administered with NMDA antagonists. It has also been used to study the σ2 activity of cocaine, and has been shown to produce anticancer properties both in vitro and in vivo.

References

External links
 

Abandoned drugs
Sigma agonists
4-Phenylpiperidines
Indoles
Fluoroarenes
Spiro compounds
Isobenzofurans